Stephen Randal Christmas (born December 9, 1957) is a former professional baseball player. He played in 24 games over three seasons in Major League Baseball for three teams, primarily as a catcher. He went 4-for-11 in 1984 for the Chicago White Sox with one home run, while getting a combined 2 hits in 26 at bats in his other two seasons.

External links
, or Retrosheet, or Pura Pelota

1957 births
Living people
Baseball players from Orlando, Florida
Buffalo Bisons (minor league) players
Chicago Cubs players
Chicago White Sox players
Cincinnati Reds players
Denver Zephyrs players
Eugene Emeralds players
Indianapolis Indians players
Iowa Cubs players
Major League Baseball catchers
Shelby Reds players
Southwestern Oklahoma State Bulldogs baseball players
Tampa Tarpons (1957–1987) players
Tigres de Aragua players
American expatriate baseball players in Venezuela
Tucson Toros players
Waterbury Reds players